POSCO (formerly Pohang Iron and Steel Company) is a South Korean steel-making company headquartered in Pohang, South Korea. In 2010, it was the world's largest steel manufacturing company by market value. Also, in 2012, it was named as the world's 146th-largest corporation by the Fortune Global 500.

POSCO currently operates two integrated steel mills in South Korea, in Pohang and Gwangyang. POSCO previously operated a joint venture with U.S. Steel, USS-POSCO Industries, in Pittsburg, California, United States, but U.S. Steel acquired full ownership of the facility in February 2020.

History

1968–1971
In the 1960s, South Korean administration concluded that self-sufficiency in steel and the construction of an integrated steelworks were essential to economic development. Since South Korea had not possessed a modern steel plant prior to 1968, many foreign and domestic businesses were skeptical of Republic of Korea Government's decision to invest so heavily in developing its own industry, Despite the skepticism, under the lead of Park Tae-joon (1927-Dec 2011), then Korea Tungsten Company president, POSCO was established as a joint venture between the Government of the RoK and the Korea Tungsten Company (predecessor of TaeguTec). It began production in 1972, just four years after the company's inauguration in April 1968 with thirty-nine employees.

Japan provided the money for the construction of the initial plant, following an agreement made at the Third South Korea-Japan Ministerial Meeting in 1969. Financing included US$119million in government grants and loans, US$54 million in credit from the Export-Import Bank of Japan, and technical assistance from Nippon Steel and other corporations.  This cooperation was one consequence of the normalization of relations with Japan in 1965 and reflected the view of the government of Japan as noted in the Nixon-Sato communique of November 21, 1969, that "the national security of the Republic of Korea is essential to the security of Japan."

1972–1992
POSCO first began to sell plate products in 1972 and focused its sales policies on the domestic market to improve steel self-sufficiency at home. It made special efforts to supply quality iron and steel to related domestic companies at below export price to strengthen their international competitiveness.

POSCO produced  of raw steel in 1980, recording a 13% increase over the previous year, and was one of the few exceptions when almost all areas of the Korean economy were in economic depression. Domestic industries absorbed POSCO's major products such as automobile and home appliance manufacturers consuming hot rolled products, shipbuilding and construction and engineering companies consuming medium plates, and electric motor and transformer manufacturers consuming electrical sheets. Some over-produced products were exported to foreign countries but the significant import of sections for construction left Korea as a net importer. Globally, POSCO was already the most efficient steel producer in certain products.

By the late 1980s, POSCO's growth had been immense. It was the fifth biggest steel company in the world, with an annual production approaching 12 million tons worth 3 trillion won. POSCO continued to expand productivity and size at a time when the steel industries of the United States and Japan were declining. POSCO completed its second-phase mill at Gwangyang in August 1988. A third-phase mill completed in 1992 further increased crude steel production to a total output of approximately 17.2 million tons a year. In terms of productivity, POSCO was the world's best steel manufacturer throughout the late 1980s and also was at the top in terms of facilities.

Pohang, previously a fishing port whose major industry was processing fish and marine products, became a major industrial center with almost 520,000 people. In addition to the huge integrated steel mill, Pohang became an industrial complex housing companies that manufacture finished steel products of raw materials provided.

Pohang University of Science and Technology (POSTECH)
POSCO CEO Park Tae-joon was quoted as saying, "You can import coal and machines, but you cannot import talent". Park realized the need for Korea to educate their youth in science and technology to ensure Korea's position in the high technology arena. Park founded the Pohang University of Science and Technology (POSTECH) in 1986 as Korea's first science and technology research-oriented university with the mission to educate young Koreans who can contribute to national prosperity through the advancement in science and technology. In 2012 and 2013, the Times Higher Education ranked POSTECH 1st in their "100 Under 50 Young Universities" rankings.

1992–1997
Changes in managerial systems and organizational structure accelerated in 1993 when POSCO's president and founder, Park Tae-Joon, who had wielded absolute managerial authority for more than 25 years, resigned.

With the change in leadership—from Park Tae-Joon to Ryu-Sang Bu, POSCO increased decentralization and diversification. POSCO's management emphasized greater flexibility, autonomy, and consensual decision-making processes. The chairman also moved to devolve more autonomy to the profit centers and changing from a strictly hierarchical organizational structure to one based on teams.

In July 1994, POSCO created two subsidiary companies, POSTEEL and POSTRADE. POSTEEL is the domestic sales and service arm of the company, while POSTRADE handles international trading of POSCO products. Both subsidiaries commenced full operation in September 1994, with all international POSCO affiliates transferred to POSTRADE by the end of that year. The landmark Posteel Tower on Tehran Street, in Seoul's Gangnam district (not to be confused with the POSCO Center, also on Tehran Street) was completed in 2003.

1997–2000
In 1997, Seoul announced that it was going to transform POSCO into a private company in line with the government's new policy of privatizing state-owned enterprises. The government planned to retain a majority share of the stock; initial reports in the South Korean press in 1998 indicated that the sale of public shares was going slower than anticipated. However, the administration led by Kim Young Sam changed the initial policy direction of privatization of POSCO and decided not to sell government-owned stock to keep it as a government investment enterprise.

But, the Kim Dae Jung administration following the Kim Young Sam administration listed privatization of public enterprise as a high priority policy in economic policy agenda to implement mainly because of outbreak of the economic crisis. The new administration decided to privatize POSCO and by 1998, the South Korean government had reduced its ownership of shares in POSCO to less than 20%, and more than 58% of the shares in POSCO were in the hands of foreign investors. In 2000, full privatization of POSCO was completed.

2001–present
As part of the privatization process, new Chairman Lee Ku-Taek began efforts to introduce a professional management and governance system of global standards for POSCO. Under the new governance system, management  made accountability to shareholders a priority. POSCO also introduced a new performance-based evaluation and compensation system. Throughout most of its privatization drive, POSCO increased its revenue and business profit. Thanks to robust demand at home and in China, POSCO recorded the largest profits in the global steel industry in 2004. Net earnings from POSCO's array of steel products – used in everything from screws to skyscrapers – shot up 80% to $1.66 billion in 2004 from the previous year.

With increasing global competition, POSCO looked to China and India for new opportunities. South Korean wages were too high to support a whole range of activities and POSCO looked elsewhere for new projects while keeping the areas where they have a comparative advantage in South Korea. By 2006, POSCO had 26 subsidiaries and invested over $2.4 billion in fresh investment on mainland China, especially in galvanized and stainless steel to supply global auto and appliance makers that have opened plants there. In 2006, POSCO started operating the Zhangjiagang Pohang Stainless Steel (ZPSS) steel mill capable of producing 600,000 tons of stainless steel and hot-rolled products annually in China's Jiangsu Province. As a result, POSCO became the first foreign firm operating an integrated stainless steel mill in China, handling the entire production process from smelting iron ore to finished products, including the cold rolled stainless plant it already operates. In June 2022, POSCO is temporarily cutting production lines in Pohang plants as thousands of truckers go on a strike for higher pay, causing disrupted cargo transport in the country.

POSCO in India
In June 2005, POSCO signed a memorandum of understanding with the State of Orissa in India. The project, which would start with a  capacity initially, would fetch revenue for the government to the tune of Rs 700 crore to Rs 800 crore (Rs 7-8 billion) annually. It would also provide direct employment to 13,000 people and ensure indirect employment for another 35,000. The Odisha state government also promised to provide a total of 600 million tons of iron sources, and will allow POSCO to use iron ore from these sources over the next 30 years. If the project goes ahead, it will be the single largest foreign direct investment in India as well as being the world's biggest greenfield steel plant ever.

However, from 2005 till date (as of August 7, 2010), the India project has not been able to proceed due to strong opposition from the local residents in the area proposed to be given for the steel plant.  There have been allegations that the federal and State governments have been illegally trying to take lands and forests for the project, in violation of the Forest Rights Act.  There have also been claims that the project will only benefit the company while displacing more people than it employs, damaging the environment and taking India's mineral resources at a very low price.

Further, a study  undertaken by the Mining Zone Peoples' Solidarity Group, an international research group focused on India, finds evidence of irregularities in dealings with state, bureaucracy and judiciary and questions and debunks the social, economic and environmental claims that the project has made.

The MoU between POSCO and State of Odisha expired in 2010. Following allegations that the ministry had not adhered to Forest Rights Act, Ministry of Environment and Forests (MoEF) set up the N.C. Saxena committee in July 2010 to review the clearance. Despite the committee's report indicating that provisions of the Forest Rights Act had been violated, the MoEF issued final order on January 31, 2011 and gave environment clearance to POSCO. 
In May 2013, the National Green Tribunal (NGT) halted land acquisition for the POSCO projects. In July 2013, POSCO completed land acquisition despite the order given by NGT. In December 2013, POSCO began construction of a boundary wall around its plant site. In December 2013, the NGT criticised the forest clearance granted by the Union Ministry of Environment and Forests (MoEF) to the proposed steel plant of South Korean steel giant, POSCO, in Odisha.

There have been reports that during protests and land acquisition during Feb - Mar 2013, there has been bombing attack on the resisting villages and naked protest against the police atrocity.

The Central Government of India came out confident on 15 January 2014 that with the renewal of environment clearance, South Korean steel giant POSCO's project in Odisha would take off soon.
After a meeting with visiting South Korean Minister of Trade, Industry and Energy Yoon Sang-jick, Mr. Sharma told the media: "So far, 1,700 acres of land — out of 2,718 acres — have been transferred to POSCO and the rest will soon be given." On July 17, 2015, news reported that South Korean steelmaker POSCO may halt a $12 billion US dollar plan agreed with Odisha, India a decade ago due to the delay in regulatory approvals. In 2016, POSCO confirms with National Green Tribunal (NGT) that it will suspend the steel plant project in Odisha, India. POSCO finally exited from this project on March 18, 2017 (Saturday).

On 13 January 2022, the Adani Group announced that it had signed an MoU with POSCO to explore the setting up of an Integrated Steel Mill in Mundra, Gujarat, with an estimated total investment of USD 5 billion.

POSCO in other developing countries

POSCO have pursued investment opportunities in other developing countries such as Vietnam and Mexico. It was announced in August 2006 that POSCO will build a large-scale steel mill in southern Vietnam. POSCO plans to build the US$1 billion plant in two phases for hot-rolled by the end of 2012 and cold rolled products by the time of December 2009. When completed, the mill is expected to produce three-million tons of steel products annually. Posco also plans to build a $250 million plant in the city of Altamira, Mexico, to produce 400,000 tons of galvanized steel sheet a year for automakers. The venture will be Posco's first wholly owned steel-plate plant in North America. Posco began construction in early 2008, and started operations in 2009, producing galvanized and galvannealed steel.

On June 30, 2006, POSCO completed the construction of its sixth continuous galvanizing line (CGL) at its Gwangyang mill in the South Jeolla Province.  With this new addition, POSCO becomes the no.2 producer of sheet-steel just behind ArcelorMittal.

In early 2007, Warren Buffett's Berkshire Hathaway purchased a 4% stake in POSCO. In 2014 they sold their share.

In February 2013 POSCO signed a Memorandum of Understanding with Afferro Mining, Inc, with a view to developing iron ore resources in Cameroon.

In November 2013, the completion of steel plant construction in Cilegon, Indonesia is scheduled. It is predicted that the annual production capability of this plant will be 3 million tons of molten iron. On July 31, 2012, the moving-in ceremony of 4 large steel structured pillars surrounding integrated steel mill furnace was held.

Operations

Head Office

POSCO's Headquarters, along with the POSCO Center, form the 'brain' of the company, overseeing major tasks, such as the management, planning, and finances of the steelworks at Pohang and Gwangyang. The construction of POSCO headquarters at 1 Goedong-dong, Nam-gu, Pohang, was completed on April 1, 1987.

POSCO Center
Hosts a variety of cultural programs, events, and exhibitions throughout the year.

Pohang and Gwangyang Steelworks

Pohang - Constructed in four phases between April 1970 and February 1981 along Korea's southeast coast, the nation's first integrated steelworks has produced 230 million tons of pig iron through March 2004 - enough to build some 250 million compact cars. Crude Steel Production (2008) = 13.6 million tons.

Gwangyang - Constructed in four phases between September 1982 and October 1992 on Korea's southern coast, the nation's second integrated steelworks. Gwangyang focus on manufacturing automotive steel, high-strength structure steel, API line pipe steel, and other strategic product categories. Crude Steel Production (2008) = 17.4 million tons.

Subsidiaries

Carbon footprint
POSCO reported Total CO2e emissions (Direct + Indirect) for 31 December 2020 at 75,650 Kt (-4,614 /-5.7% y-o-y).

See also
List of steel producers
List of South Korean companies
Economy of South Korea
History of the steel industry (1970-current)

References

External links

 POSCO
 Official POSCO Newsroom
 Yahoo! Finance page for PKX
 Yahoo! Finance page for 005490.KS
 Posco India
 India environment portal for resources on POSCO
 History of POSCO 1968-2010

 
Companies listed on the New York Stock Exchange
Berkshire Hathaway
North Gyeongsang Province
Chaebol
Steel companies of South Korea
Pohang
Companies based in Pohang
Manufacturing companies established in 1968
Auto parts suppliers of South Korea
South Korean brands
Companies listed on the London Stock Exchange
Companies listed on the Tokyo Stock Exchange
Companies listed on the Korea Exchange
South Korean companies established in 1968